Sasha Perl-Raver (born August 21, 1978) is an American actress, film critic, and TV personality who grew up in Oakland, California.

Career

Critic
From 2010–13, she appeared as the primary film critic and entertainment reporter for KNBC and, on January 10, 2014, she began co-hosting the FX's FX Movie Download.

She has interviewed numerous celebrities, including Matthew McConaughey, Jared Leto, Robert Redford, Robin Williams, Robert De Niro, Barbra Streisand, Vince Vaughn, and Jennifer Garner while reviewing films.

Since November 2016, she has been one of the hosts on Screen Junkies spin-off YouTube channel Screen Junkies News. Prior to that, she regularly appeared as a co-host of the Collider YouTube series Collider TV Talk.

Chef
In 2009, Perl-Raver was a chef on Private Chefs of Beverly Hills. She began cooking to earn money at the age of 16 after finishing high school in three years. Since then, she has worked as a private chef for a number of celebrities.

Her recipes have been published in four books.

Actress
She has had bit parts in a dozen television series and films, including The Muse, and starred as herself in five series.

Other ventures
She was crowned Miss San Francisco in 1999.

Personal life
Her mother is Miki Raver, who is an author, former talent agent, motivational religious speaker and former production company owner.

She graduated from the University of Southern California.

She married actor Jason Richard Fox in August 2014. The couple had their first child in March 2018.

References

American film critics
American actresses
Living people
American women film critics
1978 births
Jewish American actresses
Jewish film people
University of Southern California alumni
21st-century American Jews
21st-century American women